Yunieska Robles Batista (born 21 March 1993) is a retired Cuban female volleyball player. She was part of the Cuba women's national volleyball team.

She participated in the 2010 FIVB Volleyball Women's World Championship, and the 2012 FIVB Volleyball World Grand Prix..
She played with Isla de la Juventud.

Clubs
  Isla de la Juventud (2010)

References

1993 births
Living people
Cuban women's volleyball players
Place of birth missing (living people)
Wing spikers
20th-century Cuban women
20th-century Cuban people
21st-century Cuban women